Monte Ferro is a mountain of the Veneto, Italy.

Mountains of the Alps
Mountains of Veneto